Malicheh (also Romanized as Mālīcheh; also known as Mālīcheh-ye Bālā) is a village in Abarj Rural District, Dorudzan District, Marvdasht County, Fars Province, Iran. It houses the Kuh-e Givehpa, a mountain of 485 m (1,591 ft). As of the 2006 census, its population was 293, in 61 families.

References 

Populated places in Marvdasht County